John Lowdermilk (born April 17, 1992) is a former American football safety. He played college football at Iowa.

Professional career

San Diego Chargers
On May 2, 2015, Lowdermilk was signed as an undrafted free agent by the San Diego Chargers. On September 5, 2015, he was waived.

Minnesota Vikings
On December 1, 2015, he was signed to the Minnesota Vikings' practice squad. On May 10, 2016, he was waived.

References

External links
Iowa Hawkeyes football bio

Further reading

Living people
American football safeties
San Diego Chargers players
Minnesota Vikings players
Tampa Bay Buccaneers players
Iowa Hawkeyes football players
1992 births